A. K. M. Hafizur Rahman is a Bangladeshi politician and the incumbent Member of Parliament from Bogra-2.

Career
Rahman was elected to Parliament from Bogra-2 as a Jatiya Party candidate in 2009.

Personal life 
Rahman was born in Baduratla in Bogra city. His first wife died on the 2002. He married Nargis Bari in the 2017.

References

Living people
9th Jatiya Sangsad members
Year of birth missing (living people)
Bangladesh Nationalist Party politicians